"While We're Young" is a 1943 song with music composed by Alec Wilder and Morty Palitz, to lyrics by Bill Engvick, which was popularized by Don Cherry, Tony Bennett and other artists. Wilder quoted his Algonquin neighbour, James Thurber, as saying that Engvick's lyrics to "While We're Young" was "the finest piece of English writing he knew". The lyric Thurber refers to begins:

Versions
Judy Garland on Miss Show Business (1955) 
Peggy Lee on Rendezvous with Peggy Lee (1949)
Single by Don Cherry (1951)
Tony Bennett, B-side to Hank Williams' "Cold, Cold Heart", and also from debut album Because of You (1956)
Perry Como with Mitchell Ayres and His Orchestra (1952) and re-recorded for the album For the Young at Heart (1960)
Red Norvo and His Orchestra  from Presenting Red Norvo EP (1954)
André Kostelanetz and His Orchestra – Mood For Love EP (1955)
Percy Faith and His Orchestra with Mitch Miller – It's So Peaceful in the Country 3x 7" EP set (1956)
Rosemary Clooney – Sings Songs for the Young at Heart EP (1956)
Johnny Mathis on his 1957 Warm LP and 1958 While We're Young EP 
Don Rondo on his Rondo, No. 2 EP (1959)
André Previn and David Rose from Secret Songs For Lovers No.3 EP (1960)
Mike Douglas, B-side to "Here's to My Jenny" (1966)
John Gary – A Heart Filled with Song (1966)
Della Reese – The Best of Della Reese (1972)
Johnny Hartman - Thank You for Everything (1998), rec. 1976
Art Garfunkel – Some Enchanted Evening (2007)

References

1943 songs
1951 singles
Songs written by Alec Wilder
Songs with lyrics by William Engvick
Johnny Mathis songs